Uttaraphimuk Elevated Tollway or colloquial name Don Muang Tollway, or just Tollway, Don Muang Tollway Public Company Limited (the Company) is the provider of tollway transport service for the section of Din Daeng District - Anusornsathan as a choice between Vibhavadi Rangsit Road (at grade road) and toll road for the people to travel along Bangkok Metropolis and its northern vicinity area and as the main road heading for the Upper Central Region, Northern Region, and Northeastern Region, with a total distance of 21.9 km.

The tollway service is operated under Tollway Concession Agreement in Respect of the Highway No. 31, Viphavadi - Rangsit Road, Din Daeng - Don Muang Section, made between the Department of Highways and the Company, to provide services to the people until September 11, 2034. The concession is in BTO system (Build-Transfer-Operate), i.e., the Company designed and built the tollway with its own funds, and was awarded the concession right to manage the tollway, including toll collection, traffic management, and rescue work, while the ownership of the property has been transferred to the Department of Highways. In its capacity as a party to the concession agreement and as the state, the Department of Highways has specified the toll rates and the timeframe for toll rate adjustment in the concession agreement and it is the duty of both parties to strictly comply with the terms and conditions of the agreement.

The private sector's operations differ from those of state enterprises or government agencies in transport project investment as the government has its mechanisms to finance transport projects without financial costs, probably by setting budgets acquired from tax collection or, if necessary, from other financial sources for investment in government projects, with special arrangements on interest rates and loan repayment periods. Besides, no concession periods are set for government projects; they can be operated for life, therefore, it is free to determine if toll collection is required or not for a project, and there exists a mechanism to determine the toll rates into any form as the conditions for government projects are far better than those for the private sector.

The Company as a member of the private sector has to operate projects under the concession period. The Company can manage projects and earn revenues within the time frame of the concession period only, while the funds for the Company's project investment are mobilized from both local and foreign investors or from financial institutions with certain financial costs and loan repayment periods, depending on the market’ practices and conditions. The Company has to use the revenue acquired from toll collection within the time limit of concession period to repay the investors or financial institutions so that they can continue to provide financial support.

In the future, this elevated tollway will become a part of Motorway No. 5, which connects Bang Pa-in to Mae Sai and Chiang Khong.

References 

Controlled-access highways in Thailand